Nepotilla microscopica is a species of sea snail, a marine gastropod mollusk in the family Raphitomidae.

Description
The length of the shell attains 1.3 mm, its diameter 0.7 mm.

(Original description) The very minute, yellowish shell contains 3½ whorls, including a 1½ whorled protoconch, which is large, rounded, and spirally lirate. The two adult whorls are strongly angled at the periphery, from whence to the 
suture they are flat or concave. The sculpture consists of sharp, narrow, axial ribs, about twelve on the body whorl, which extend from suture to suture, and pass into the aperture. They are widely separated, the interspaces being crossed by a few very faint spiral lirae. The aperture  is rather expanded. The siphonal canal is very short. The columella is excavate. The outer lip is strongly varixed. The sinus at the suture is deep and open and bordered by a varix.

Distribution
This marine species is endemic to Australia and occurs off Tasmania.

References

 Gatliff, J.H. & Gabriel, C.J. 1916. Additions to the alterations in the Catalogue of the Marine Shells of Victoria. Proceedings of the Royal Society of Victoria 29(1): 106-113
 Powell, A.W.B. 1966. The molluscan families Speightiidae and Turridae, an evaluation of the valid taxa, both Recent and fossil, with list of characteristic species. Bulletin of the Auckland Institute and Museum. Auckland, New Zealand 5: 1–184, pls 1–23

External links
  Hedley, C. 1922. A revision of the Australian Turridae. Records of the Australian Museum 13(6): 213-359, pls 42-56 
 Atlas of Living Australia: Nepotilla aculeata
 
 Grove, S.J. (2018). A Guide to the Seashells and other Marine Molluscs of Tasmania: Nepotilla microscopica

microscopica
Gastropods described in 1916
 Gastropods of Australia